control(human, data, sound) is a technology performance created by Bob van Luijt and performed in December 2014. During the performance a dancer wears a "Brain Sense Wearable" that sends its OCR data to a Node.js application that contains a music composition. In 2015 the work was selected as an awards Finalist for CREATE 2015 in Pittsburgh, USA, in the category art+technology.

Background
The project is an abstraction of the interaction between a human and his/her data. As Bob van Luijt states on chds.io: "A human being is able to contextualize data, and it’s the context that gives data its value. But a computer merely observes my data, based on algorithms that try to give context. That context makes sense sometimes, but often it doesn’t make sense at all. In the meantime, the data just sits there as a source of information, without any meaning."

Reception
control(human, data, sound) was selected by a jury for exhibition at the following international art and design events:
Venice Art Week - Borders & Disorders, March 13–20, 2015 and Berlin DMY International Design Festival, June 11–14, 2015

See also
 CHDS.io, website with background information
 IMDB profile for control(human, data, sound)

References

Performances
2014 compositions